Vishal Vishwas Dabholkar (born 23 March 1987) is a cricketer who has played for Mumbai in Indian domestic cricket. He is a slow left-arm orthodox bowler.

Dabholkar made his first-class debut in the quarter-final of 2012-13 Ranji Trophy against Baroda. He picked up 3/88 in the first innings and 1/63 in the second innings. In November 2013, against Punjab, he had figures of 6/38 and 4/37. In October 2015 he helped Mumbai to a one-wicket victory over Tamil Nadu when he took 5/122 and 7/53 and, batting at number 11, hit the winning run.

References

External links 

Indian cricketers
Mumbai cricketers
Living people
1987 births